Calgary's Chinatown is a district of Calgary located along Centre Street in the southeast area of Downtown Calgary immediately west of the Downtown East Village. Calgary's Chinese Cultural Centre with its traditional architecture and decor (styled after the Temple of Heaven in Beijing) is the largest facility of its kind in North America. The Dragon City Mall is also located in this district.

The area along Centre Street north of downtown and continuing for several blocks is also very Asian-influenced and is often thought of as the city's second Chinatown. International Avenue is also a major multi-ethnic centre in the city's southeast with considerable Asian influence.

The community has an area redevelopment plan in place.

Demographics

Residents in this community had a median household income of $16,174 in 2000 (the lowest in the city), and there were 57% low income residents living in the neighbourhood.

As of 2000, 92.1% of the residents were immigrants. A proportion of 98.6% of the buildings were condominiums or apartments, and 86% of the housing was used for renting.

See also
 Chinatown
 Canadian Chinese cuisine
 Chinatowns in Canada

References

External links
City of Calgary - Chinatown

Chinese-Canadian culture in Alberta
Neighbourhoods in Calgary
Calgary